Maria Andreyevna Kameneva (born 27 May 1999) is a Russian competitive swimmer. She won nine medals at the 2015 European Games. Six of them were gold (1 is individual, 5 are in relays), one was silver (individual) and two were bronze (both individual).

External links
 on the 2015 European Games website

1999 births
Living people
People from Orenburg
Russian female swimmers
Russian female freestyle swimmers
Russian female backstroke swimmers
European Games gold medalists for Russia
European Games silver medalists for Russia
European Games bronze medalists for Russia
European Games medalists in swimming
Swimmers at the 2015 European Games
Medalists at the FINA World Swimming Championships (25 m)
Universiade medalists in swimming
European Aquatics Championships medalists in swimming
Universiade silver medalists for Russia
Medalists at the 2017 Summer Universiade
Swimmers at the 2020 Summer Olympics
Sportspeople from Orenburg Oblast
21st-century Russian women